Bebearia ashantina, the Ashanti forester, is a butterfly in the family Nymphalidae. It is found in Ivory Coast and Ghana. The habitat consists of forests.

Adults are attracted to fallen fruit.

References

Butterflies described in 1913
ashantina